Number 16 Squadron, nicknamed the Saints, is a flying squadron of the Royal Air Force providing Elementary Flying Training (EFT) with the Grob Tutor T.1 from RAF Wittering. 

It formed in 1915 at Saint-Omer to carry out a mixture of offensive patrolling and reconnaissance and was disbanded in 1919 with the end of the First World War.  The squadron reformed on 1 April 1924 and again took on a reconnaissance role which it continued throughout the Second World War. Post-war, the squadron was disbanded and reformed several times and was converted to a bomber squadron.  Equipped with the Tornado GR.1 from 1984 the squadron took part in the Gulf War in 1990.  It was again disbanded in September 1991, before reforming in November 1991 as the Operational Conversion Unit for the Jaguar.  With the Jaguar's imminent withdrawal from service, the squadron disbanded once more in 2005. No. 16 Squadron reformed again and took on its current role on 1 October 2008.

History

Early years

The Squadron was formed at Saint-Omer, France on 10 February 1915 from elements of Nos. 2, 6 and 9 Squadrons. It immediately began fighting in the First World War under Hugh Dowding, and for some time was based at the aerodrome at the Beaupré-sur-la-Lys Abbey in La Gorgue.  For the rest of the Great War, the 'Saints' were deployed throughout Northern France and operated a mixture of aircraft including Bleriot XI, Martinsyde S.1 and Royal Aircraft Factory B.E.2c on offensive patrol and tactical reconnaissance duties. Disbandment occurred on New Year's Eve 1919.

In September 1915 Duncan Grinnell-Milne joined the squadron as a junior pilot, and later (1933) published an account of his time in the squadron. His portrait of Dowding (who when the book was originally published had not then attained his later fame) is unflattering.

The squadron was reformed at Old Sarum in the tactical reconnaissance role on 1 April 1924.  Initially it operated the Bristol Fighter but this was replaced by the Atlas in January 1931 and by the Audax in December 1933.

Second World War
In May 1938, the Westland Lysander arrived and the Squadron continued in its tactical role in wartime France from April 1940.  In May 1940 it returned to England and conducted roving sea patrols searching for both downed aircrew and enemy forces.

From April 1942, 16 Squadron was re-equipped with the Allison-engined North American Mustang I for fighter sweeps and reconnaissance duties over France from its base at RAF Weston Zoyland in Somerset. The Spitfire Mk V took over this role from September 1943. On 2 June 1943 the Squadron became part of the Strategic Reconnaissance Wing of the 2nd Tactical Air Force as a high-altitude photo reconnaissance unit with Spitfire PR Mk IXs based at Hartford Bridge.  In the build-up to D Day, No 16 supplied photographs instrumental to the planning of the Allied landings.

Cold War (1946–1991)

No. 16 Squadron was disbanded at Celle on 1 April 1946 but reformed at RAF Fassberg the same day and took the 24 cylinder H-engined Hawker Tempest Mk V on charge until converting to the radial-engined Mk II on 7 June 1946.  On 7 December 1948, the squadron took delivery of its first jet aircraft, the de Havilland Vampire FB.5, which gave way to the de Havilland Venom FB.1 in November 1954 until disbandment at Celle once more on 1 June 1957.

As East-West relations cooled, the Squadron reformed at RAF Laarbruch on 1 March 1958.  No. 16 Squadron maintained a permanent readiness state, tasked with meeting the Soviet threat, in the expected conventional phase and with the use of tactical nuclear weapons.  The squadron was re-quipped with the Canberra B(I).8 armed with dual-key nuclear weapons.

The Canberra gave way to the Buccaneer S.2B on 16 October 1972.  The squadron's twelve Buccaneers were equipped with a variety of conventional weapons and eighteen British WE.177 nuclear bombs. Although Buccaneers could carry two WE.177 weapons, after taking into account attrition in the conventional phase of a high-intensity European war, and after withholding some aircraft in reserve, RAF planners expected that squadron strength remaining would still be sufficient to deliver the nuclear weapons stockpile. The Buccaneer distinguished itself in many bombing exercises; among its victories included the winning of the Salmond Trophy in 1978 and 1979.

The squadron briefly expanded in 1983-84, absorbing some aircraft and men from its sister 15 Squadron which had converted to the Panavia Tornado GR.1. 16 Squadron followed in late 1984 following the 'designate' process where a new 16 Squadron formed up at RAF Honington before moving to Laarbruch and assuming the squadron standard from the Buccaneer unit which had continued to operate throughout. Despite the change of aircraft the squadron's role remained unchanged in countering a Soviet threat in Europe with conventional weapons and eighteen WE.177 nuclear bombs. As with the Buccaneer, there was a ratio of 1.5 weapons per aircraft.

Ahead of Operation GRANBY in 1990 and the first Gulf War, the squadron deployed to Tabuk airbase.  No. 16 was the lead squadron in the deployment with No. 20 and crews from other Tornado GR.1 squadrons.  The 'Tabuk Force' used JP233s and 1,000 lb bombs on low-level sorties against Iraqi airfields and other targets.  Some of the Squadron's aircraft later formed a TIALD flight that conducted accurate medium-level bombing.  

Following hostilities, the Squadron disbanded on 11 September 1991.

SEPECAT Jaguar (1991–2005)

On 1 November 1991, the Squadron reformed at RAF Lossiemouth as No. 16(Reserve) Squadron, a reserve squadron and an Operational Conversion Unit, replacing and taking over the aircraft and weapons of No. 226 OCU, training and converting new pilots for the SEPECAT Jaguar.  Although no longer a front-line operational squadron, as a reserve, or shadow squadron, its twelve aircraft were equipped with conventional weapons and eight WE.177 nuclear weapons for use in a high-intensity European war, and it remained assigned to SACEUR for that purpose.

Although a non-operational squadron, its pilots were still involved in Operation DENY FLIGHT and Operation NORTHERN WATCH. The squadron moved to RAF Coltishall, Norfolk, on 21 July 2000.

In December 2003, the MoD announced with the Delivering Security in a Changing World defence review that RAF Coltishall would close in 2007 and the Jaguar fleet would be retired early. This led to the disbandment of No. 16 Squadron on 11 March 2005 as the Jaguar approached retirement.  The Squadron Standard was laid up in Notre-Dame Cathedral Saint-Omer, France on 20 March 2005.

Elementary Flying Training (2008–present)
On 1 October 2008, the Squadron was reformed at RAF Cranwell, Lincolnshire as part of No. 22 Group operating the Grob Tutor T.1.  No. 16(R) Squadron continues its training role by instructing new Royal Air Force pilots in Elementary Flying Training (EFT) as part of No.1 Elementary Flying Training School.  From 2005 to 2008 the unit was previously known as 1 Squadron, 1 EFTS following a restructuring of the RAF's pilot training.  16(R) Squadron instructs the RAF's new pilots and some pilots from overseas.  The Squadrons' role is to provide pilots to the more advanced flying training courses on their way to earning the coveted pilot wings and joining the front line.  In early 2008, Prince William took his first steps on his aviation career at No. 16 Squadron's site flying his first solo sortie in Tutor G-BYXN; his father was also taught to fly at RAF Cranwell in 1971.

In the first half of 2015, No. 16(R) Squadron, along with No. 115(R) Squadron relocated to RAF Wittering, Cambridgeshire, which saw flying return to the base for the first time since 2010.

Aircraft operated

Aircraft operated included:

Commanding officers

Commanding officers included:

Stations
Stations included:

See also
List of Royal Air Force aircraft squadrons

References

External links

No.16 Squadron RAF
Air of Authority - A History of RAF Organisation - No 16 - 20 Squadron Histories - No 16 Squadron

Military units and formations established in 1915
016 Squadron
016 Squadron
Aircraft squadrons of the Royal Air Force in World War II
Military units and formations of the Gulf War
Military units and formations disestablished in 2005
Military units and formations established in 2008
1915 establishments in the United Kingdom